, there were over 100,000 publications registered with the Registrar of Newspapers for India. India has the second-largest newspaper market in the world, with daily newspapers reporting a combined circulation of over 240 million copies . There are publications produced in each of the 22 scheduled languages of India and in many of the other languages spoken throughout the country. Hindi-language newspapers have the largest circulation, followed by English and Telugu. Newsstand and subscription prices often cover only a small percentage of the cost to produce newspapers in India, and advertising is the primary source of revenue. 

Newspapers

See also 

Other lists of Indian newspapers
List of newspapers in India by circulation
List of newspapers in India by readership
Language-specific lists of newspapers published in Indian languages

List of Kannada-language newspapers
List of Marathi-language newspapers
List of Malayalam-language newspapers
List of Meitei-language newspapers
List of Punjabi-language newspapers
List of Tamil-language newspapers

Notes

References 
  Indian All Newspapers and Media List

 
List
Lists of newspapers by country